Switch Up may refer to:
 Switch Up (Big Sean song)
 Switch Up (R. Kelly song)
 SwitchUp, an online coding and computing programing platform